The Journal of Environmental Biology is a bimonthly peer-reviewed scientific journal published by Triveni Enterprises. It covers all aspects of environmental sciences, toxicology, and related fields. The editor-in-chief is R.C. Dalela, who started the journal in 1980.

Publication 
Print-issues are published bimonthly (January, March, May, July, September, November) and almost immediately after that, the contents are also published online with free access.

Impact factor 
According to the Journal Citation Reports, the journal has a 2011 impact factor of 0.640, ranking it 180th out of 205 journals in the category "Environmental Sciences".

References

External links 
 

Environmental science journals
Bimonthly journals
English-language journals
Publications established in 1980
Open access journals